Later... with Jools Holland (also known as Even Later... with Jools Holland, and previously known as Later Live... with Jools Holland and ...Later with Jools Holland) is a contemporary British music television show hosted by Jools Holland. A spin-off of The Late Show, it has been running in short series since 8 October 1992 and is now part of BBC Two's Saturday Night Music block, usually broadcast at around 10pm The day of transmission has varied over the years, but  it is usually recorded on a Tuesday for Saturday broadcast and features a mixture of both established and new musical artists, from solo performers to bands and larger ensembles.

The show is considered an institution, having notched up millions of fans around the world. It is currently broadcast in America on MTV Live (formerly known as Palladia); previously it had been shown on Ovation, BBC America, Fuse, and Dave. The Ovation and Fuse broadcasts leave out several performances (and usually one or two performers entirely) to air commercials within a one-hour timeslot. It is also shown in Australia on the UKTV channel and ABC2, in Canada on HIFI and AUX TV, in Germany on ZDFkultur, in Spain on Canal+ Xtra, in Croatia on HRT 2, in Latin America on Film&Arts and in Belgium, France, Portugal, Switzerland, and the United Arab Emirates on iConcerts HD, and in Ireland on TG4.

The 200th programme was broadcast on 1 February 2008. The 250th edition was broadcast in September 2010.

Programme format
Later... draws from a diverse palette of both popular and world music, and each show features around five bands with a variety of styles performing for each other and a studio audience of around 300 people. Jools Holland introduces the show and interviews one or more of the performers. A unique feature is the short jam session that begins each show, involving all of his invited guests, along with Holland on piano. This beginning jam session also best shows the unusual layout of the set – all the bands are arrayed in a circle with the audience filling in the gaps between them. Holland often also accompanies his guests' performances, with mixed results – Mark E. Smith of the Fall insisted that he would only appear on the show if Holland would promise not to play piano over any of his songs. Over time, these jam sessions have changed - the end of the hour-long show ends with a jam session now - and Jools accompanies relatively few artists in comparison to earlier seasons.

On 1 April 2008, a new format was debuted, featuring a 30-minute, fully live show broadcast on a Tuesday, Later Live... with Jools Holland, followed by the original hour-long pre-recorded show, Later... with Jools Holland, typically broadcast on a Friday. The Friday show features the performances recorded on a Tuesday as well as others recorded during the session for the live show. The HD hour-long broadcasts use Dolby Digital 5.1, which adds to the overall ambience of the studio environment. For Series 51, the hour-long show was moved to Saturday nights, seemingly to accommodate the new BBC One show, Sounds Like Friday Night.

After the 2012 closure of BBC Television Centre for redevelopment, production from April 2013 moved to Studio 1 at The Maidstone Studios, close to Holland's home in Cooling, Kent.

2018 tendering process

Later... and Jools' Annual Hootenanny were opened up to tender in 2018, with the contract to produce the show being retained by BBC Studios. A number of changes were made to the show's format, with the 60-minute show having a more relaxed feel, including "bespoke films and backstage interviews". Each 60-minute programme also saw Holland joined by a special guest to co-host. The October 2019 series of the programme saw it return to Television Centre, where it was filmed until 2012. It is filmed in TC1, the largest studio on the site.

As of Series 54 both editions are pre-recorded: the 30 minute edition airs Thursday night at 10pm, with the 60 minute Even Later edition airing Friday night, usually at around 11 pm to 12 midnight, as part of BBC Two's post-Newsnight late-night line-up.

In 2020, the format was changed due to the COVID-19 pandemic, with Holland introducing guests via videolink from his Helicon Mountain home studio and the programme becoming 45 minutes in length, as Newsnight was now starting at 10:45pm.

After a number of years where the show had been broadcast on Tuesday and Friday nights, in October 2021, series 59 started to be broadcast on a Saturday, still in a 45 minute format, at around 10pm, as part of a schedule block devoted to music programming. In 2022, the programme moved from Helicon Mountain to a permanent location at the restored Alexandra Palace Theatre in North London, with Wet Leg, Joe Bonamassa and Cat Burns appearing on the first episode recorded at the theatre, which was episode one of series 60.

Special editions
Occasional special editions of the show showcase a major artist under the Later... banner, with the Later presents... title. Artists featured in these shows have included Alice in Chains in 1992, Paul Weller and Metallica in 1996, R.E.M. and the Verve in 1998, Oasis in 2000, Radiohead in 2001 and 2007, and the Red Hot Chili Peppers in 2007. The bands in question play for the duration of the hour-long show. Despite the different name, the show is still introduced by Jools Holland and takes place in a similarly set-up studio.

The special episode featuring M People in 1998 was later released on video and DVD under the title One Night in Heaven. Also, a selection of the songs from the programme have been released on the limited edition of The Best of M People album and as a b-side to the single "Dreaming".

Special editions broadcast on New Year's Eve each year are referred to as Jools Holland's Hootenanny and are pre-recorded, typically in early December. In 2003 a 'Spring Hootenanny' was broadcast, which proved to be a one-off.

In 2017, to celebrate the 25th anniversary of the show, a Later 25 show was held at London's Royal Albert Hall - it was recorded on 21 September 2017 and broadcast two days later on the 23rd. The setup was roughly similar, with bands located around the arena of the Hall with some artists also on the stage. The 2 hour long show featured 10 artists.

Repeated excerpts from the show were broadcast under the title A Little Later as fill-in programmes on BBC HD, while in 2022, BBC Four had a number of new Later compilations made for the channel, themed around various musical genres like pop or musical collaborations.

On 12 November 2022 a special "30th Birthday Bash" programme, recorded at London’s Eventim Apollo in London, was broadcast on BBC 2. It was followed by the special "The A-Z of Later... with Jools Holland: From Adele to ZZ Top, narrated by comedian Paul Whitehouse.

Criticism
In 2008, the head rock and pop critic of The Guardian, Alexis Petridis, claimed the programme featured a "distinct lack of spontaneity" and was failing to showcase enough dance music, pop, hip-hop, experimental music or present R&B artists. He also argued "all the artists it breaks are essentially the same: MOR singer-songwriters".

In 2010, Joe Elliott, lead singer of rock band Def Leppard, criticised the programme for excluding the band from appearing on it, claiming "Jools Holland won't have us on his show because we're not cool enough."

Accolades
In 2000, the series was ranked at number 81 in the British Film Institute's list of the "BFI TV 100", listing the top 100 British television programmes of the 20th century.

Discography
Numerous albums containing performances from the show have been released over the course of the show's run.
1996 ...Later Volume One: Brit Beat
1996 ...Later with Jools Holland Volume Two: Slow Beats
2008 Later... with Jools Holland The First 15 Years
2008 Later... with Jools Holland Live
2009 Later... with Jools Holland Live 2

Music DVDs have also been released, listed below:
2003 Later... with Jools Holland Hootenanny
2003 Later... with Jools Holland Giants
2003 Later... with Jools Holland Louder
2005 Later... with Jools Holland Even Louder
2005 Later with Jools Holland: World
2006 Later... with Jools Holland Mellow
2006 Best of Later... with Jools Holland
2008 Later... with Jools Holland The First 15 Years
Two DVDs subtitled Cool Britannia

Shows

See also
 The Tube

References

External links 

A Little Later
 

BBC high definition shows
BBC Television shows
BBC television talk shows
1992 British television series debuts
1990s British music television series
2000s British music television series
2010s British music television series
2020s British music television series
English-language television shows
Television series by BBC Studios